Ennica Mukomberanwa (born 1978) is a Zimbabwean sculptor.  The daughter of Grace Mukomberanwa and Nicholas Mukomberanwa, she was trained by the first generation of sculptures. Her work is exhibited in private collections and at galleries around the world. She is a third generation Zimbabwean sculptor. In 2004, she was awarded a prize which allowed her to travel to Stockholm, Copenhagen, Scotland, and Canada. She is a member of the Mukomberanwa family of sculptors. She is the daughter of Grace Mukomberanwa and Nicholas Mukomberanwa, who served as her mentor.  She is the sister of sculptors Anderson, Netsai, Taguma, Tendai Mukomberanwa and Lawrence Mukomberanwa, and the cousin of Nesbert Mukomberanwa.

Career
Her work focuses on Shona culture and she mainly created smaller statutes although she has created a number of larger ones. She was one of the artists on featured at the International Sculpture symposium" held by the Andres Institute of Art in New Hampshire, CT in 2014 where she worked with granite stone.
Her educational background college is in education and human resources.

Exhibitions
 Nashua International Sculpture Symposium 2015. Mother and Child stone sculpture, Nashua, New Hamsphire 
 Andres Institute of Art Symposium 2014:Carving out Loud. We are One, sculpture, Brrokline New Hampshire  
Zimsculpt 2006 onwards
African Excellence in Art Exhibit – Oslo, Norway 2004
 Charles Sumner School Museum Exhibit, Washington D.C. 2004
In Praise of Women International Exhibit – Richmond, Canada 2004
In Praise Of Women Intentional Exhibit – South Africa 2003
Zolla Gallery, Heidelberg –  Germany 1999
National Gallery Harare – Zimbabwe 1994

Awards 
 "Comforting" - Sculpture, Women in the Arts Award Honoree, Orlando Florida 2019 
"The Fisherman" – Best Sculptor on Show, National Gallery of Art, Zimbabwe 2005
"Woman Artist of the Year" – 2004

References

External links
Biography, with pictures

1978 births
Living people
People from Mashonaland East Province
Zimbabwean women sculptors
20th-century Zimbabwean women artists
21st-century Zimbabwean women artists
Women stone carvers
21st-century Zimbabwean sculptors
20th-century Zimbabwean sculptors